Povorsk is a village in Volhyna region in Ukraine, in Kovel Raion of Volyn Oblast. The town is 25 kilometers east of Kovel. It has a population of 1875.

History 
On June 26, 1941, the German army occupied the village. From August to September 1942, Jews of the village were kept in a ghetto. In September 1942, an Einsatzgruppen murdered 200 Jews in a mass execution.

References 

Holocaust locations in Ukraine
Villages in Kovel Raion